The Breezand-class tugboats are used by the Royal Netherlands Navy, primarily to dock their smaller ships at the Nieuwe Haven Naval Base. In winter they are also used as icebreaker.

Ships in class

Namesakes 
The ships are named after locations near Den Helder:
 HNLMS Breezand's namesake is: The village of Breezand
 HNLMS Balgzand's namesake is: Nature reserve Balgzand

Notes

Citations

References 
 

Tugboats of the Royal Netherlands Navy